Mont d'Ambin (in French) or Rocca d'Ambin (in Italian) is a mountain on the border of Savoie, France and of the Province of Turin, Italy. It lies in the Ambin group of the Cottian Alps. On the Italian side, it commands the view of the Val di Susa. The Mont d'Ambin base tunnel of the Lyon–Turin rail link is being dug at its base.

Maps
 Italian official cartography (Istituto Geografico Militare – IGM); on-line version: www.pcn.minambiente.it
 French official cartography (Institut Géographique National – IGN); on-line version: www.geoportail.fr
 Istituto Geografico Centrale – Carta dei sentieri e dei rifugi scala 1:50.000 n. 1 Valli di Susa Chisone e Germanasca e 1:25.000 n. 104 Bardonecchia Monte Thabor Sauze d'Oulx

References 

Mountains of Savoie
Mountains of Piedmont
Mountains of the Alps
Alpine three-thousanders
France–Italy border
International mountains of Europe
Mountains partially in France